Mongrel2 is an open-source "language agnostic" web server written by Zed Shaw, and is the successor to Shaw's Mongrel server. The server supports HTTP, Flash XMLSockets, WebSockets and long polling connections.

Language agnostic
Mongrel2 is described as language agnostic, meaning it does not prefer any specific programming language over another. The server's documentation says:

Development
Shaw began working on the server in June 2010 and released version 1.0 of the software on September 1, 2010. Mongrel2 has nothing in common with the original Mongrel webserver, except for using the same HTTP parser.

References

External links

Free web server software
2010 software
Web server software for Linux